Tone Hulbækmo (born 27 September 1957) is a Norwegian singer and musician, married to the traditional folk flutist Hans Fredrik Jacobsen, and the mother of Jazz drummer and vibraphonist Hans Hulbækmo (b. 1989) and pianist Alf Hulbækmo (b. 17 March 1992).

Discography
1983: Kåmmå No
1985: Kalenda Maya
1986: Svevende Jord
1988: Langt Nord I Skogen
1989: Norske Middelalderballader 
1995: Konkylie
1997: Pilgrimsreiser (Kalenda Maya)
1999: Kyrja
2012: Nordic Woman (Grappa Music)
2016: Stifinner (Heilo Records).

Awards
1984: Spellemannprisen 1983 in Folk album category for album Kåmmå no .. 
1989: Spellemannprisen 1988 in Music for children category for albumet Langt nord i skogen together with Hans Fredrik Jacobsen 
2004: Skjæraasenprisen, together with Hans Fredrik Jacobsen 
2006: Gammleng Award in folk music category.

References

1957 births
Norwegian women singers
Heilo Music artists
Living people
Musicians from Tolga, Norway